Oncocera is a genus of snout moths. It was described by James Francis Stephens in 1829.

Species

 Oncocera affinis Balinsky, 1994
 Oncocera argentilavella Hampson, 1901
 Oncocera bibasella de Joannis, 1927
 Oncocera cenochreella Ragonot, 1888
 Oncocera dubia Balinsky, 1994
 Oncocera faecella Zeller, 1839
 Oncocera flavitinctella Ragonot, 1893
 Oncocera floridana de Joannis, 1927
 Oncocera franki Caradja, 1931
 Oncocera furvicostella Ragonot, 1893
 Oncocera glaucocephalis Balinsky, 1994
 Oncocera grisella Balinsky, 1994
 Oncocera griseosparsella Ragonot, 1893
 Oncocera homotypa Balinsky, 1994
 Oncocera horrens Balinsky, 1994
 Oncocera hortensis Balinsky, 1994
 Oncocera ignicephalis Balinsky, 1994
 Oncocera inermis Balinsky, 1994
 Oncocera infausta Ragonot, 1893
 Oncocera injucunda Balinsky, 1994
 Oncocera karkloofensis Balinsky, 1994
 Oncocera laetanella Lucas, 1937
 Oncocera leucosticta de Joannis, 1927
 Oncocera lugubris Balinsky, 1994
 Oncocera mikadella Ragonot, 1893
 Oncocera mundellalis Walker, 1863
 Oncocera natalensis Ragonot, 1888
 Oncocera nigerrima Balinsky, 1994
 Oncocera nonplagella Balinsky, 1994
 Oncocera ochreomelanella Ragonot, 1888
 Oncocera polygraphella de Joannis, 1927
 Oncocera psammathella Hampson, 1926
 Oncocera pulchra Balinsky, 1994
 Oncocera quilicii Guilletmet, 2007
 Oncocera salisburyensis Balinsky, 1994
 Oncocera sarniensis Balinsky, 1994
 Oncocera scalaris de Joannis, 1927
 Oncocera semirubella (Scopoli, 1763)
 Oncocera similis Balinsky, 1994
 Oncocera sinicolella Caradja, 1926
 Oncocera spiculata Balinsky, 1994
 Oncocera spissa Balinsky, 1994
 Oncocera squamata Balinsky, 1994
 Oncocera submundellalis Caradja, 1927
 Oncocera tahlaella Dumont, 1932
 Oncocera umbrosella Erschoff, 1876
 Oncocera zoetendalensis Balinsky, 1994

References

External links

 Catalogue of Life

Phycitini
Pyralidae genera
Taxa named by James Francis Stephens